Miguel Murillo (1898–1968) was a Bolivian footballer who played as a goalkeeper for Bolivia in the 1930 FIFA World Cup. He also played for Club Bolívar.

References

External links
FIFA profile

Footballers from La Paz
Bolivian footballers
Bolivia international footballers
Association football goalkeepers
Club Bolívar players
1930 FIFA World Cup players
1898 births
1968 deaths